Alankrita Bora  is an Indian actress, model and a professional dancer based in Kathak, Bharatnatyam and Contemporary dance form, who made her Bollywood debut through 2018 movie Raja Abroadiya, directed by Lakhwinder Shabla. She also appeared in Nanhi Si Kali: Betiyaan.

Filmography

Miss Diva - 2016 Contestants

References

External links
 

Assamese people
Indian film actresses
Actresses in Assamese cinema
Actresses from Guwahati
21st-century Indian actresses
Living people
Year of birth missing (living people)